Mateo Andres Corbo Sottolano (born April 21, 1976 in Montevideo) is a Uruguayan former footballer who played as a left full back.

Biography
Corbo played for A-League club Newcastle United Jets for the inaugural A-League season. He previously played for River Plate (1996–99), Real Oviedo (1999–2000), Barnsley F.C. (2000–02, scoring once against Stoke City in the League Cup), River Plate, (2003) Olimpia Asuncion (2004), and Oxford United (2005).

Playing style
Corbo is best known for his rock-solid defensive skills and his aggression on the field.

References

 

1976 births
Living people
Footballers from Montevideo
A-League Men players
Association football fullbacks
Barnsley F.C. players
Club Olimpia footballers
Newcastle Jets FC players
Oxford United F.C. players
Club Atlético River Plate (Montevideo) players
Expatriate footballers in Paraguay
La Liga players
Real Oviedo players
Uruguayan footballers
Expatriate soccer players in Australia
Uruguayan expatriates in Australia
Association football defenders